Potocki Palace is a palace of the Potocki family:

 Potocki Palace, Warsaw
 Potocki Palace, Lviv
 Potocki Palace, Natolin
 Potocki Palace, Odessa
 Potocki Palace, Tulchyn
 Potocki Palace, Krzeszowice
 Potocki Palace, Międzyrzec Podlaski
 Potocki Palace, Chervonohrad
 Potocki Palace, Brody

Other former properties of the Potocki family 
 Wilanów Palace
 Łańcut Palace
 Pomoriany Castle
 Zator Castle
 Livadia Palace
 Potocki Palace, Antoniny, Ukraine -- destroyed in the Russian Civil War in August 1919